Menaria (Menariya, Menaria) is a warrior community found in south Rajasthan, mainly across Udaipur, Chittorgarh, Bhilwara and Rajsamand.

About
Menaria (मेनारिया in Hindi), also known as Menaria, Menaria Samaj is a caste inhabiting the Indian state of Rajasthan, originated in the districts of Udaipur, Chittorgarh, Bhilwara and Rajsamand. Menaria is one of the subcaste of Brahmin community, They engaged in all kind of priestly work and also acquire a large amount of farming land and descent farmers, from the region and is often referred to as 52 Kheda Brahmin (Kheda means village).

History
The Menaria community is found in places such as Cheerwa (Udaipur) Vallabhnagar (Udaipur), Girva (Udaipur), Chittorgarh, Pratapgarh, Kapasan, Badi Sadri, Doongla, Varni, Neemach and Mandsaur and Indore district. The largest villages of Menaria's are Menar, Rundera, Kharsan, Panerion Ki Madri, Sangriya ( सांगरिया जोशी) ,Chorwadi, Gawardi, Nilod, Mahuda, Suwaniya, Chokdi, Vana, Batherda khurd (joshi).

The famous village of Menaria Samaj is Batheda khurd which have ancient temple of Maa Kalika. Most people of Batherda khurd (Menaria Samaj) work and are settled abroad in the US, Europe or the UAE, etc.

The biggest village of Menaria Samaj are Menar, and Rundera started a project named Hariyalo Rundera & Hariyalo Menar. In that project people of villages started planting trees.
 
A village which is away from Menar Region name gawardi started a mission named Project Green Gawardi. In that mission the youth of the village planted trees among the whole village. This was a great initiative appreciated by the whole Menaria Samaj.

Menariya during the Mughal era
After a treaty was signed between the Mewar and the Mughals, many armed stations were established across Mewar State. Maharana Amarsingh was the king then. After the attack at Uthala Fort by Mughals, villagers of Menar, taking inspiration from the incident, took up arms and defeated the Mughals. The day fell on Jamra Beej (the second day after Holi) which is celebrated till today by the locals to cherish the valour and heroism of their ancestors. Villagers get together at Omkareshwar square and fireworks and guns are fired, sweets are distributed.

Notable people 
 Ashok Menaria (born 29 October 1991) is an Indian cricketer from the Udaipur district.

References

S, Monika (11 June 2017). "Congratulations Arpit Menaria |22nd position in JEE(Advanced)2017". Udaipur Times.
"Court Judge Count Report: State Rajasthan: District Chittorgarh".

Indian castes
Social groups of Rajasthan
Hindu surnames
Indian surnames